Kim Mestdagh (born 12 March 1990) is a Belgian basketball player for Perfumerias Avenida of the Liga Femenina de Baloncesto and the Belgian national team.

Mestdagh played U.S. college basketball at Colorado State University from 2008 to 2012, finishing her career fourth on the Rams' all-time scoring list.

She played on the Belgian teams which won the bronze medal at EuroBasket Women 2017 and finished in fourth place at the 2018 FIBA Women's Basketball World Cup. She is openly lesbian.

WNBA career statistics

Regular season

|-
|style="text-align:left;background:#afe6ba;"|  2019†
| align="left" | Washington
| 15 || 0 || 4.7 || .389 || .400 || 1.000 || 0.3 || 0.4 || 0.1 || 0.0 || 0.4 || 1.5
|-
| align="left" | Career
| align="left" | 1 year, 1 team
| 15 || 0 || 4.7 || .389 || .400 || 1.000 || 0.3 || 0.4 || 0.1 || 0.0 || 0.4 || 1.5

Playoffs

|-
|style="text-align:left;background:#afe6ba;"|  2019†
| align="left" | Washington
| 1 || 0 || 1.0 || .000 || .000 || .000 || 0.0 || 0.0 || 0.0 || 0.0 || 0.0 || 0.0
|-
| align="left" | Career
| align="left" | 1 year, 1 team
| 1 || 0 || 1.0 || .000 || .000 || .000 || 0.0 || 0.0 || 0.0 || 0.0 || 0.0 || 0.0

Colorado State statistics

Source

References

External links
 
 
 Colorado States Rams bio
 
 
 

1990 births
Living people
Belgian expatriate basketball people in France
Belgian expatriate basketball people in Spain
Belgian expatriate basketball people in Turkey
Belgian expatriate basketball people in the United States
Belgian women's basketball players
Olympic basketball players of Belgium
Colorado State Rams women's basketball players
Sportspeople from Ypres
Shooting guards
Washington Mystics players
Basketball players at the 2020 Summer Olympics

Belgium LGBT sportspeople